Susan Jolly Abeja  is a Ugandan politician and member of the parliament. She was elected in office as a woman Member to represent Otuke district during the 2021 Uganda general elections.

She is an Independent member of parliament. Susan was among the 132 MPs who were  sworn in for a five-year term as representatives for different constituencies across the country, in the 11th Parliament on May 17, 2021.

See also 

 List of members of the eleventh Parliament of Uganda
 Otuke District
Parliament of Uganda
Julius Bua Acon

References

External links 
 Website of the Parliament of Uganda.

21st-century Ugandan women politicians
21st-century Ugandan politicians
Living people
Women members of the Parliament of Uganda
Members of the Parliament of Uganda
Year of birth missing (living people)